According to consensus in modern genetics, anatomically modern humans first arrived on the Indian subcontinent from Africa between 73,000 and 55,000 years ago. However, the earliest known human remains in South Asia date to 30,000 years ago. Sedentariness, which involves the transition from foraging to farming and pastoralism, began in South Asia around 7000 BCE. At the site of Mehrgarh, its presence can be documented, with evidence of domestication of wheat and barley, rapidly followed by that of goats, sheep, and cattle. By 4500 BCE, such settled life had increasingly spread,  and began to gradually evolve into the Indus Valley civilisation, which was contemporaneous with Ancient Egypt and Mesopotamia. This civilisation flourished between 2500 BCE and 1900 BCE in present-day Pakistan and north-western India, and was noted for its urban planning, baked brick houses, elaborate drainage, and water supply.

Early on in the second millennium BCE, persistent drought caused the population of the Indus Valley to scatter from large urban centres to villages. Around the same time, Indo-Aryan tribes moved into the Punjab from Central Asia in several waves of migration. The Vedic Period (1500–500 BCE) was marked by the composition of their large collections of hymns called Vedas. Their varna system, which evolved into the caste system, consisted of a hierarchy of priests, warriors, free peasants, and servants. The pastoral and nomadic Indo-Aryans spread from the Punjab into the Gangetic plain, large swaths of which they deforested for agriculture. The composition of Vedic texts ended around 600 BCE, when a new, interregional culture arose. Then, small chieftaincies (janapadas) were consolidated into larger states (mahajanapadas).

A second urbanisation took place, which came with the rise of new ascetic movements and religious concepts in Greater Magadha, including the rise of Jainism and Buddhism. These opposed the growing influence of Brahmanism and the primacy of ritualsoften presided by Brahmin prieststhat had come to be associated with Vedic religion. In response to the success of these movements, the latter was synthesised with the preexisting religious cultures of the subcontinent, giving rise to Hinduism.

Alexander the Great invaded India in 326 BCE. This weakened the Northwestern states and enabled the formation of the first great empire in ancient India, the Maurya Empire. Most of the Indian subcontinent was conquered by the Maurya Empire during the 4th and 3rd centuries BCE. From the 3rd century BCE onwards, Prakrit and Pali literature in the north and Tamil Sangam literature in southern India started to flourish. Wootz steel originated in south India in the 3rd century BCE and was exported. The Maurya Empire would collapse in 185 BCE, on the assassination of the then-Emperor Brihadratha by his General Pushyamitra Shunga. Shunga would go on to form the Shunga Empire in the North and Northeast of the subcontinent, while the Greco-Bactrian Kingdom would claim the Northwest and found the Indo-Greek Kingdom. Various parts of India were ruled by numerous dynasties, including the Gupta Empire in the 4-6th centuries CE. 

This period, witnessing a Hindu religious and intellectual resurgence, is known as the Classical or Golden Age of India. During this time, aspects of Indian civilisation, administration, culture, and religion spread to much of Asia. Kingdoms in southern India had maritime business links with the Middle East and the Mediterranean. Indian cultural influence spread over many parts of Southeast Asia, which led to the establishment of Indianised kingdoms in the region, forming the Greater India.

The most significant event between the 7th and 11th century was the Tripartite struggle centred on Kannauj that lasted for more than two centuries between the Pala Empire, Rashtrakuta Empire, and Gurjara-Pratihara Empire. Southern India saw the rise of multiple imperial powers from the middle of the fifth century, most notably the Chalukya, Chola, Pallava, Chera, Pandyan, and Western Chalukya Empires. The Chola dynasty conquered southern India and successfully invaded parts of Southeast Asia, Sri Lanka, the Maldives, and Bengal in the 11th century. In the early medieval period Indian mathematics, including Hindu numerals, influenced the development of mathematics and astronomy in the Arab world, including the creation of the Hindu-Arabic numeral system.

Islamic conquests made limited inroads into modern Afghanistan and Sindh as early as the 8th century, followed by the invasions of Mahmud Ghazni.
The Delhi Sultanate was founded in 1206 CE by Central Asian Turks who ruled a major part of the northern Indian subcontinent in the early 14th century, but declined in the late 14th century, and saw the advent of the Deccan sultanates. The wealthy Bengal Sultanate also emerged as a major power, lasting over three centuries.
This period also saw the emergence of several powerful Hindu states, notably the Vijayanagara Empire and Rajput states, such as Mewar. The 15th century saw the advent of Sikhism. 

The early modern period began in the 16th century, when the Mughal Empire conquered most of the Indian subcontinent, signaling the proto-industrialization, becoming the biggest global economy and manufacturing power, with a nominal GDP that valued a quarter of world GDP, superior to that of Europe. The Mughals suffered a gradual decline in the early 18th century, which provided opportunities for the Marathas, Sikhs, Mysoreans, Nizams, and Nawabs of Bengal to exercise control over large regions of the Indian subcontinent.

From the mid-18th century to the mid-19th century, large regions of India were gradually annexed by the East India Company, a chartered company acting as a sovereign power on behalf of the British government. Dissatisfaction with company rule in India led to the Indian Rebellion of 1857, which rocked parts of north and central India, and led to the dissolution of the company. India was afterwards ruled directly by the British Crown, in the British Raj. After World War I, a nationwide struggle for independence was launched by the Indian National Congress, led by Mahatma Gandhi, notable for nonviolence. Later, the All-India Muslim League would advocate for a separate Muslim-majority nation state. The British Indian Empire was partitioned in August 1947 into the Dominion of India and Dominion of Pakistan, each gaining its independence.

Prehistoric era (until c. 3300 BCE)

Paleolithic 
Hominin expansion from Africa is estimated to have reached the Indian subcontinent approximately two million years ago, and possibly as early as 2.2 million years before the present. This dating is based on the known presence of Homo erectus in Indonesia by 1.8 million years before the present and in East Asia by 1.36 million years before present, as well as the discovery of stone tools at Riwat in the Soan River valley of the Pabbi Hills region, Pakistan. Although some older discoveries have been claimed, the suggested dates, based on the dating of fluvial sediments, have not been independently verified.

The oldest hominin fossil remains in the Indian subcontinent are those of Homo erectus or Homo heidelbergensis, from the Narmada Valley in central India, and are dated to approximately half a million years ago. Older fossil finds have been claimed, but are considered unreliable. Reviews of archaeological evidence have suggested that occupation of the Indian subcontinent by hominins was sporadic until approximately 700,000 years ago, and was geographically widespread by approximately 250,000 years before the present, from which point onward, archaeological evidence of proto-human presence is widely mentioned.

According to a historical demographer of South Asia, Tim Dyson: Modern human beings—Homo sapiens—originated in Africa. Then, intermittently, sometime between 60,000 and 80,000 years ago, tiny groups of them began to enter the north-west of the Indian subcontinent. It seems likely that initially, they came by way of the coast. ... it is virtually certain that there were Homo sapiens in the subcontinent 55,000 years ago, even though the earliest fossils that have been found of them date to only about 30,000 years before the present.

According to Michael D. Petraglia and Bridget Allchin: Y-Chromosome and Mt-DNA data support the colonization of South Asia by modern humans originating in Africa. ... Coalescence dates for most non-European populations average to between 73–55 ka.

And according to historian of South Asia, Michael H. Fisher: Scholars estimate that the first successful expansion of the Homo sapiens range beyond Africa and across the Arabian Peninsula occurred from as early as 80,000 years ago to as late as 40,000 years ago, although there may have been prior unsuccessful emigrations. Some of their descendants extended the human range ever further in each generation, spreading into each habitable land they encountered. One human channel was along the warm and productive coastal lands of the Persian Gulf and northern Indian Ocean. Eventually, various bands entered India between 75,000 years ago and 35,000 years ago.

Archaeological evidence has been interpreted to suggest the presence of anatomically modern humans in the Indian subcontinent 78,000–74,000 years ago, although this interpretation is disputed. The occupation of South Asia by modern humans, over a long time, initially in varying forms of isolation as hunter-gatherers, has turned it into a highly diverse one, second only to Africa in human genetic diversity.

According to Tim Dyson: Genetic research has contributed to knowledge of the prehistory of the subcontinent's people in other respects. In particular, the level of genetic diversity in the region is extremely high. Indeed, only Africa's population is genetically more diverse. Related to this, there is strong evidence of ‘founder’ events in the subcontinent. By this is meant circumstances where a subgroup—such as a tribe—derives from a tiny number of ‘original’ individuals. Further, compared to most world regions, the subcontinent's people are relatively distinct in having practised comparatively high levels of endogamy.

Neolithic 

Settled life emerged on the subcontinent in the western margins of the Indus River alluvium approximately 9,000 years ago, evolving gradually into the Indus Valley Civilisation of the third millennium BCE. According to Tim Dyson: "By 7,000 years ago agriculture was firmly established in Baluchistan. And, over the next 2,000 years, the practice of farming slowly spread eastwards into the Indus valley." And according to Michael Fisher:  "The earliest discovered instance ... of well-established, settled agricultural society is at Mehrgarh in the hills between the Bolan Pass and the Indus plain (today in Pakistan) (see Map 3.1). From as early as 7000 BCE, communities there started investing increased labor in preparing the land and selecting, planting, tending, and harvesting particular grain-producing plants. They also domesticated animals, including sheep, goats, pigs, and oxen (both humped zebu [Bos indicus] and unhumped [Bos taurus]). Castrating oxen, for instance, turned them from mainly meat sources into domesticated draft-animals as well."

Bronze Age (c. 3300 – c. 1800 BCE)

Indus Valley Civilisation 

The Bronze Age in the Indian subcontinent began around 3300 BCE. Along with Ancient Egypt and Mesopotamia, the Indus Valley region was one of three early cradles of civilization of the Old World. Of the three, the Indus Valley civilisation was the most expansive, and at its peak, may have had a population of over five million.

The civilisation was primarily centered in modern-day Pakistan, in the Indus river basin, and secondarily in the Ghaggar-Hakra River basin in eastern Pakistan and northwestern India. The mature Indus civilisation flourished from about 2600 to 1900 BCE, marking the beginning of urban civilisation on the Indian subcontinent. The civilisation included cities such as Harappa, Ganweriwal, and Mohenjo-daro in modern-day Pakistan, and Dholavira, Kalibangan, Rakhigarhi, and Lothal in modern-day India.

Inhabitants of the ancient Indus river valley, the Harappans, developed new techniques in metallurgy and handicraft (carneol products, seal carving), and produced copper, bronze, lead, and tin. The civilisation is noted for its cities built of brick, roadside drainage system, and multi-storeyed houses and is thought to have had some kind of municipal organisation. Civilization also developed a Indus script, which is presently undeciphered. This is the reason why Harappan language is not directly attested, and its affiliation uncertain. A relationship or membership of the Dravidian or Elamo-Dravidian language family is proposed by some scholars.

After the collapse of Indus Valley civilisation, the inhabitants of the Indus Valley civilisation migrated from the river valleys of Indus and Ghaggar-Hakra, towards the Himalayan foothills of Ganga-Yamuna basin.

Ochre Coloured Pottery culture 

During 2nd millennium BCE, Ochre Coloured Pottery culture was in Ganga Yamuna Doab region. These were rural settlement with agriculture and hunting. They were using copper tools such as axes, spears, arrows, and swords. The people had domesticated cattle, goats, sheep, horses, pigs and dogs. The site gained attention for its Bronze Age solid-disk wheel carts, found in 2018, which were interpreted by some as horse-pulled "chariots".

Iron Age (c. 1800 – 200 BCE)

Vedic period (c. 1500 – 600 BCE) 

Starting ca. 1900 BCE, Indo-Aryan tribes moved into the Punjab from Central Asia in several waves of migration. The Vedic period is the period when the Vedas were composed, the liturgical hymns from the Indo-Aryan people. The Vedic culture was located in part of north-west India, while other parts of India had a distinct cultural identity during this period. Many regions of the Indian subcontinent transitioned from the Chalcolithic to the Iron Age in this period.

The Vedic culture is described in the texts of Vedas, still sacred to Hindus, which were orally composed and transmitted in Vedic Sanskrit. The Vedas are some of the oldest extant texts in India. The Vedic period, lasting from about 1500 to 500 BCE, contributed the foundations of several cultural aspects of the Indian subcontinent.

Vedic society 

Historians have analysed the Vedas to posit a Vedic culture in the Punjab region and the upper Gangetic Plain. The peepal tree and cow were sanctified by the time of the Atharva Veda. Many of the concepts of Indian philosophy espoused later, like dharma, trace their roots to Vedic antecedents.

Early Vedic society is described in the Rigveda, the oldest Vedic text, believed to have been compiled during 2nd millennium BCE, in the northwestern region of the Indian subcontinent. At this time, Aryan society consisted of largely tribal and pastoral groups, distinct from the Harappan urbanisation which had been abandoned. The early Indo-Aryan presence probably corresponds, in part, to the Ochre Coloured Pottery culture in archaeological contexts.

At the end of the Rigvedic period, the Aryan society began to expand from the northwestern region of the Indian subcontinent, into the western Ganges plain. It became increasingly agricultural and was socially organised around the hierarchy of the four varnas, or social classes. This social structure was characterized both by syncretising with the native cultures of northern India, but also eventually by the excluding of some indigenous peoples by labeling their occupations impure. During this period, many of the previous small tribal units and chiefdoms began to coalesce into Janapadas (monarchical, state-level polities).

Janapadas 

The Iron Age in the Indian subcontinent from about 1200 BCE to the 6th century BCE is defined by the rise of Janapadas, which are realms, republics and kingdoms—notably the Iron Age Kingdoms of Kuru, Panchala, Kosala, Videha.

The Kuru state organised the Vedic hymns into collections, and developed the srauta ritual to uphold the social order. Two key figures of the Kuru state were king Parikshit and his successor Janamejaya, transforming this realm into the dominant political, social, and cultural power of northern Iron Age India. When the Kuru kingdom declined, the centre of Vedic culture shifted to their eastern neighbours, the Panchala kingdom. The archaeological PGW (Painted Grey Ware) culture, which flourished in the Haryana and western Uttar Pradesh regions of northern India from about 1100 to 600 BCE, is believed to correspond to the Kuru and Panchala kingdoms.

During the Late Vedic Period, the kingdom of Videha emerged as a new centre of Vedic culture, situated even farther to the East (in what is today Nepal and Bihar state in India); reaching its prominence under the king Janaka, whose court provided patronage for Brahmin sages and philosophers such as Yajnavalkya, Aruni, and Gārgī Vāchaknavī. The later part of this period corresponds with a consolidation of increasingly large states and kingdoms, called Mahajanapadas, all across Northern India.

Second urbanisation (c. 600 – 200 BCE) 

The period between 800 and 200 BCE saw the formation of Śramaṇa movement from Jainism and Buddhism originated. The first Upanishads were written during this period. After 500 BCE, the so-called "second urbanisation" started, with new urban settlements arising at the Ganges plain, especially the Central Ganges plain. The foundations for the "second urbanisation" were laid prior to 600 BCE, in the Painted Grey Ware culture of the Ghaggar-Hakra and Upper Ganges Plain; although most PGW sites were small farming villages, "several dozen" PGW sites eventually emerged as relatively large settlements that can be characterized as towns, the largest of which were fortified by ditches or moats and embankments made of piled earth with wooden palisades, albeit smaller and simpler than the elaborately fortified large cities which grew after 600 BCE in the Northern Black Polished Ware culture.

The Central Ganges Plain, where Magadha gained prominence, forming the base of the Maurya Empire, was a distinct cultural area, with new states arising after 500 BCE during the so-called "second urbanisation". It was influenced by the Vedic culture, but differed markedly from the Kuru-Panchala region. It "was the area of the earliest known cultivation of rice in South Asia and by 1800 BCE was the location of an advanced Neolithic population associated with the sites of Chirand and Chechar". In this region, the Śramaṇic movements flourished, and Jainism and Buddhism originated.

Buddhism and Jainism 

The time between 800 BCE and 400 BCE witnessed the composition of the earliest Upanishads. The Upanishads form the theoretical basis of classical Hinduism, and are also known as Vedanta (conclusion of the Vedas).

The increasing urbanisation of India in the 7th and 6th centuries BCE led to the rise of new ascetic or "Śramaṇa movements" which challenged the orthodoxy of rituals. Mahavira (c. 549–477 BCE), proponent of Jainism, and Gautama Buddha (c. 563–483 BCE), founder of Buddhism, were the most prominent icons of this movement. Śramaṇa gave rise to the concept of the cycle of birth and death, the concept of samsara, and the concept of liberation. Buddha found a Middle Way that ameliorated the extreme asceticism found in the Śramaṇa religions.

Around the same time, Mahavira (the 24th Tirthankara in Jainism) propagated a theology that was to later become Jainism. However, Jain orthodoxy believes the teachings of the Tirthankaras predates all known time and scholars believe Parshvanatha (c. 872 – c. 772 BCE), accorded status as the 23rd Tirthankara, was a historical figure. The Vedas are believed to have documented a few Tirthankaras and an ascetic order similar to the Śramaṇa movement.

Sanskrit epics 

The Sanskrit epics Ramayana and Mahabharata were composed during this period. The Mahabharata remains, till this day, the longest single poem in the world. Historians formerly postulated an "epic age" as the milieu of these two epic poems, but now recognize that the texts (which are both familiar with each other) went through multiple stages of development over centuries. For instance, the Mahabharata may have been based on a small-scale conflict (possibly about 1000 BCE) which was eventually "transformed into a gigantic epic war by bards and poets". Archaeology cannot conclusively prove or disprove the historicity related to the epics. The existing texts of these epics are believed to belong to the post-Vedic age, between c. 400 BCE and 400 CE.

Mahajanapadas 

The period from c. 600 BCE to c. 300 BCE witnessed the rise of the Mahajanapadas, sixteen powerful and vast kingdoms and oligarchic republics. These Mahajanapadas evolved and flourished in a belt stretching from Gandhara in the northwest to Bengal in the eastern part of the Indian subcontinent and included parts of the trans-Vindhyan region. Ancient Buddhist texts, like the Aṅguttara Nikāya, make frequent reference to these sixteen great kingdoms and republics—Anga, Assaka, Avanti, Chedi, Gandhara, Kashi, Kamboja, Kosala, Kuru, Magadha, Malla, Matsya (or Machcha), Panchala, Surasena, Vṛji, and Vatsa. This period saw the second major rise of urbanism in India after the Indus Valley Civilisation.

The most famous clan amongst the ruling confederate clans of the Vajji Mahajanapada were the Licchavis.

This period corresponds in an archaeological context to the Northern Black Polished Ware culture. Especially focused in the Central Ganges plain but also spreading across vast areas of the northern and central Indian subcontinent, this culture is characterized by the emergence of large cities with massive fortifications, significant population growth, increased social stratification, wide-ranging trade networks, construction of public architecture and water channels, specialized craft industries (e.g., ivory and carnelian carving), a system of weights, punch-marked coins, and the introduction of writing in the form of Brahmi and Kharosthi scripts. The language of the gentry at that time was Sanskrit, while the languages of the general population of northern India are referred to as Prakrits.

Many of the sixteen kingdoms had coalesced into four major ones by 500/400 BCE, by the time of Gautama Buddha. These four were Vatsa, Avanti, Kosala, and Magadha. The life of Gautama Buddha was mainly associated with these four kingdoms.

Early Magadha dynasties 

Magadha formed one of the sixteen Mahajanapadas (Sanskrit: "Great Realms") or kingdoms in ancient India. The core of the kingdom was the area of Bihar south of the Ganges; its first capital was Rajagriha (modern Rajgir) then Pataliputra (modern Patna). Magadha expanded to include most of Bihar and Bengal with the conquest of Licchavi and Anga respectively, followed by much of eastern Uttar Pradesh and Orissa. The ancient kingdom of Magadha is heavily mentioned in Jain and Buddhist texts. It is also mentioned in the Ramayana, Mahabharata and Puranas. The earliest reference to the Magadha people occurs in the Atharva-Veda where they are found listed along with the Angas, Gandharis, and Mujavats. Magadha played an important role in the development of Jainism and Buddhism. The Magadha kingdom included republican communities such as the community of Rajakumara. Villages had their own assemblies under their local chiefs called Gramakas. Their administrations were divided into executive, judicial, and military functions.

Early sources, from the Buddhist Pāli Canon, the Jain Agamas and the Hindu Puranas, mention Magadha being ruled by the Pradyota dynasty and Haryanka dynasty (c. 544–413 BCE) for some 200 years, c. 600–413 BCE. King Bimbisara of the Haryanka dynasty led an active and expansive policy, conquering Anga in what is now eastern Bihar and West Bengal. King Bimbisara was overthrown and killed by his son, Prince Ajatashatru, who continued the expansionist policy of Magadha. During this period, Gautama Buddha, the founder of Buddhism, lived much of his life in the Magadha kingdom. He attained enlightenment in Bodh Gaya, gave his first sermon in Sarnath and the first Buddhist council was held in Rajgriha. The Haryanka dynasty was overthrown by the Shaishunaga dynasty (c. 413–345 BCE). The last Shishunaga ruler, Kalasoka, was assassinated by Mahapadma Nanda in 345 BCE, the first of the so-called Nine Nandas, which were Mahapadma and his eight sons.

Nanda Empire and Alexander's campaign 

The Nanda Empire (c. 345–322 BCE), at its greatest extent, extended from Bengal in the east, to the Punjab region in the west and as far south as the Vindhya Range. The Nanda dynasty was famed for their great wealth. The Nanda dynasty built on the foundations laid by their Haryanka and Shishunaga predecessors to create the first great empire of north India. To achieve this objective they built a vast army, consisting of 200,000 infantry, 20,000 cavalry, 2,000 war chariots and 3,000 war elephants (at the lowest estimates). According to the Greek historian Plutarch, the size of the Nanda army was even larger, numbering 200,000 infantry, 80,000 cavalry, 8,000 war chariots, and 6,000 war elephants. However, the Nanda Empire did not have the opportunity to see their army face Alexander the Great, who invaded north-western India at the time of Dhana Nanda, since Alexander was forced to confine his campaign to the plains of Punjab and Sindh, for his forces mutinied at the river Beas and refused to go any further upon encountering Nanda and Gangaridai forces.

Maurya Empire 

The Maurya Empire (322–185 BCE) unified most of the Indian subcontinent into one state, and was the largest empire ever to exist on the Indian subcontinent. At its greatest extent, the Mauryan Empire stretched to the north up to the natural boundaries of the Himalayas and to the east into what is now Assam. To the west, it reached beyond modern Pakistan, to the Hindu Kush mountains in what is now Afghanistan. The empire was established by Chandragupta Maurya assisted by Chanakya (Kautilya) in Magadha (in modern Bihar) when he overthrew the Nanda Empire.

Chandragupta rapidly expanded his power westwards across central and western India, and by 317 BCE the empire had fully occupied Northwestern India. The Mauryan Empire then defeated Seleucus I, a diadochus and founder of the Seleucid Empire, during the Seleucid–Mauryan war, thus gained additional territory west of the Indus River. Chandragupta's son Bindusara succeeded to the throne around 297 BCE. By the time he died in c. 272 BCE, a large part of the Indian subcontinent was under Mauryan suzerainty. However, the region of Kalinga (around modern day Odisha) remained outside Mauryan control, perhaps interfering with their trade with the south.

Bindusara was succeeded by Ashoka, whose reign lasted for around 37 years until his death in about 232 BCE. His campaign against the Kalingans in about 260 BCE, though successful, led to immense loss of life and misery. This filled Ashoka with remorse and led him to shun violence, and subsequently to embrace Buddhism. The empire began to decline after his death and the last Mauryan ruler, Brihadratha, was assassinated by Pushyamitra Shunga to establish the Shunga Empire.

Under Chandragupta Maurya and his successors, internal and external trade, agriculture, and economic activities all thrived and expanded across India thanks to the creation of a single efficient system of finance, administration, and security. The Mauryans built the Grand Trunk Road, one of Asia's oldest and longest major roads connecting the Indian subcontinent with Central Asia. After the Kalinga War, the Empire experienced nearly half a century of peace and security under Ashoka. Mauryan India also enjoyed an era of social harmony, religious transformation, and expansion of the sciences and of knowledge. Chandragupta Maurya's embrace of Jainism increased social and religious renewal and reform across his society, while Ashoka's embrace of Buddhism has been said to have been the foundation of the reign of social and political peace and non-violence across all of India. Ashoka sponsored the spreading of Buddhist missionaries into Sri Lanka, Southeast Asia, West Asia, North Africa, and Mediterranean Europe.

The Arthashastra wrote by Chanakya and the Edicts of Ashoka are the primary written records of the Mauryan times. Archaeologically, this period falls into the era of Northern Black Polished Ware. The Mauryan Empire was based on a modern and efficient economy and society. However, the sale of merchandise was closely regulated by the government. Although there was no banking in the Mauryan society, usury was customary. A significant amount of written records on slavery are found, suggesting a prevalence thereof. During this period, a high-quality steel called Wootz steel was developed in south India and was later exported to China and Arabia.

Sangam period 

During the Sangam period Tamil literature flourished from the 3rd century BCE to the 4th century CE. During this period, three Tamil dynasties, collectively known as the Three Crowned Kings of Tamilakam: Chera dynasty, Chola dynasty, and the Pandya dynasty ruled parts of southern India.

The Sangam literature deals with the history, politics, wars, and culture of the Tamil people of this period. The scholars of the Sangam period rose from among the common people who sought the patronage of the Tamil Kings, but who mainly wrote about the common people and their concerns. Unlike Sanskrit writers who were mostly Brahmins, Sangam writers came from diverse classes and social backgrounds and were mostly non-Brahmins. They belonged to different faiths and professions such as farmers, artisans, merchants, monks, and priests, including also royalty and women.

Around c. 300 BCE – c. 200 CE, Pathupattu, an anthology of ten mid-length books collection, which is considered part of Sangam Literature, were composed; the composition of eight anthologies of poetic works Ettuthogai as well as the composition of eighteen minor poetic works Patiṉeṇkīḻkaṇakku; while Tolkāppiyam, the earliest grammarian work in the Tamil language was developed. Also, during Sangam period, two of the Five Great Epics of Tamil Literature were composed. Ilango Adigal composed Silappatikaram, which is a non-religious work, that revolves around Kannagi, who having lost her husband to a miscarriage of justice at the court of the Pandyan dynasty, wreaks her revenge on his kingdom, and Manimekalai, composed by Chithalai Chathanar, is a sequel to Silappatikaram, and tells the story of the daughter of Kovalan and Madhavi, who became a Buddhist Bikkuni.

Classical period (c. 200 BCE – c. 650 CE) 

The time between the Maurya Empire in the 3rd century BCE and the end of the Gupta Empire in the 6th century CE is referred to as the "Classical" period of India. It can be divided in various sub-periods, depending on the chosen periodisation. Classical period begins after the decline of the Maurya Empire, and the corresponding rise of the Shunga Empire and Satavahana dynasty. The Gupta Empire (4th–6th century) is regarded as the "Golden Age" of Hinduism, although a host of kingdoms ruled over India in these centuries. Also, the Sangam literature flourished from the 3rd century BCE to the 3rd century CE in southern India. During this period, India's economy is estimated to have been the largest in the world, having between one-third and one-quarter of the world's wealth, from 1 CE to 1000 CE.

Early classical period (c. 200 BCE – c. 320 CE)

Shunga Empire 

The Shungas originated from Magadha, and controlled large areas of the central and eastern Indian subcontinent from around 187 to 78 BCE. The dynasty was established by Pushyamitra Shunga, who overthrew the last Maurya emperor. Its capital was Pataliputra, but later emperors, such as Bhagabhadra, also held court at Vidisha, modern Besnagar in Eastern Malwa.

Pushyamitra Shunga ruled for 36 years and was succeeded by his son Agnimitra. There were ten Shunga rulers. However, after the death of Agnimitra, the empire rapidly disintegrated; inscriptions and coins indicate that much of northern and central India consisted of small kingdoms and city-states that were independent of any Shunga hegemony. The empire is noted for its numerous wars with both foreign and indigenous powers. They fought battles with the Mahameghavahana dynasty of Kalinga, Satavahana dynasty of Deccan, the Indo-Greeks, and possibly the Panchalas and Mitras of Mathura.

Art, education, philosophy, and other forms of learning flowered during this period including small terracotta images, larger stone sculptures, and architectural monuments such as the Stupa at Bharhut, and the renowned Great Stupa at Sanchi. The Shunga rulers helped to establish the tradition of royal sponsorship of learning and art. The script used by the empire was a variant of Brahmi and was used to write the Sanskrit language. The Shunga Empire played an imperative role in patronising Indian culture at a time when some of the most important developments in Hindu thought were taking place. This helped the empire flourish and gain power.

Satavahana Empire 

The Śātavāhanas were based from Amaravati in Andhra Pradesh as well as Junnar (Pune) and Prathisthan (Paithan) in Maharashtra. The territory of the empire covered large parts of India from the 1st century BCE onward. The Sātavāhanas started out as feudatories to the Mauryan dynasty, but declared independence with its decline.

The Sātavāhanas are known for their patronage of Hinduism and Buddhism, which resulted in Buddhist monuments from Ellora (a UNESCO World Heritage Site) to Amaravati. They were one of the first Indian states to issue coins struck with their rulers embossed. They formed a cultural bridge and played a vital role in trade as well as the transfer of ideas and culture to and from the Indo-Gangetic Plain to the southern tip of India.

They had to compete with the Shunga Empire and then the Kanva dynasty of Magadha to establish their rule. Later, they played a crucial role to protect large part of India against foreign invaders like the Sakas, Yavanas and Pahlavas. In particular, their struggles with the Western Kshatrapas went on for a long time. The notable rulers of the Satavahana Dynasty Gautamiputra Satakarni and Sri Yajna Sātakarni were able to defeat the foreign invaders like the Western Kshatrapas and to stop their expansion. In the 3rd century CE the empire was split into smaller states.

Trade and travels to India 

 The spice trade in Kerala attracted traders from all over the Old World to India. Early writings and Stone Age carvings of Neolithic age obtained indicates that India's Southwest coastal port Muziris, in Kerala, had established itself as a major spice trade centre from as early as 3,000 BCE, according to Sumerian records. Jewish traders from Judea arrived in Kochi, Kerala, India as early as 562 BCE.
 Buddhism entered China through the Silk Road transmission of Buddhism in the 1st or 2nd century CE. The interaction of cultures resulted in several Chinese travellers and monks to enter India. Most notable were Faxian, Yijing, Song Yun and Xuanzang. These travellers wrote detailed accounts of the Indian subcontinent, which includes the political and social aspects of the region.
 Hindu and Buddhist religious establishments of Southeast Asia came to be associated with the economic activity and commerce as patrons entrust large funds which would later be used to benefit the local economy by estate management, craftsmanship, promotion of trading activities. Buddhism in particular, travelled alongside the maritime trade, promoting coinage, art, and literacy. Indian merchants involved in spice trade took Indian cuisine to Southeast Asia, where spice mixtures and curries became popular with the native inhabitants.
 The Greco-Roman world followed by trading along the incense route and the Roman-India routes. During the 2nd century BCE Greek and Indian ships met to trade at Arabian ports such as Aden. During the first millennium, the sea routes to India were controlled by the Indians and Ethiopians that became the maritime trading power of the Red Sea.

Kushan Empire 

The Kushan Empire expanded out of what is now Afghanistan into the northwest of the Indian subcontinent under the leadership of their first emperor, Kujula Kadphises, about the middle of the 1st century CE. The Kushans were possibly of Tocharian speaking tribe; one of five branches of the Yuezhi confederation. By the time of his grandson, Kanishka the Great, the empire spread to encompass much of Afghanistan, and then the northern parts of the Indian subcontinent at least as far as Saketa and Sarnath near Varanasi (Banaras).

Emperor Kanishka was a great patron of Buddhism; however, as Kushans expanded southward, the deities of their later coinage came to reflect its new Hindu majority. They played an important role in the establishment of Buddhism in India and its spread to Central Asia and China.

Historian Vincent Smith said about Kanishka:

The empire linked the Indian Ocean maritime trade with the commerce of the Silk Road through the Indus valley, encouraging long-distance trade, particularly between China and Rome. The Kushans brought new trends to the budding and blossoming Gandhara art and Mathura art, which reached its peak during Kushan rule.

H.G. Rowlinson commented:

By the 3rd century, their empire in India was disintegrating and their last known great emperor was Vasudeva I.

Classical period (c. 320 – 650 CE)

Gupta Empire 

The Gupta period was noted for cultural creativity, especially in literature, architecture, sculpture, and painting. The Gupta period produced scholars such as Kalidasa, Aryabhata, Varahamihira, Vishnu Sharma, and Vatsyayana who made great advancements in many academic fields. The Gupta period marked a watershed of Indian culture: the Guptas performed Vedic sacrifices to legitimise their rule, but they also patronised Buddhism, which continued to provide an alternative to Brahmanical orthodoxy. The military exploits of the first three rulers – Chandragupta I, Samudragupta, and Chandragupta II – brought much of India under their leadership. Science and political administration reached new heights during the Gupta era. Strong trade ties also made the region an important cultural centre and established it as a base that would influence nearby kingdoms and regions in: Sri Lanka; Maritime Southeast Asia (Brunei, Indonesia, Malaysia, Philippines, Singapore, and Timor-Leste); as well as Indochina (Cambodia, Laos, Myanmar, Thailand, and Vietnam).

The latter Guptas successfully resisted the northwestern kingdoms until the arrival of the Alchon Huns, who established themselves in Afghanistan by the first half of the 5th century CE, with their capital at Bamiyan. However, much of the southern India including Deccan were largely unaffected by these events in the north.

Vakataka Empire 

The Vākāṭaka Empire originated from the Deccan in the mid-third century CE. Their state is believed to have extended from the southern edges of Malwa and Gujarat in the north to the Tungabhadra River in the south as well as from the Arabian Sea in the western to the edges of Chhattisgarh in the east. They were the most important successors of the Satavahanas in the Deccan, contemporaneous with the Guptas in northern India and succeeded by the Vishnukundina dynasty.

The Vakatakas are noted for having been patrons of the arts, architecture and literature. They led public works and their monuments are a visible legacy. The rock-cut Buddhist viharas and chaityas of Ajanta Caves (a UNESCO World Heritage Site) were built under the patronage of Vakataka emperor, Harishena.

Kamarupa Kingdom 

Samudragupta's 4th-century Allahabad pillar inscription mentions Kamarupa (Western Assam) and Davaka (Central Assam) as frontier kingdoms of the Gupta Empire. Davaka was later absorbed by Kamarupa, which grew into a large kingdom that spanned from Karatoya river to near present Sadiya and covered the entire Brahmaputra valley, North Bengal, parts of Bangladesh and, at times Purnea and parts of West Bengal.

Ruled by three dynasties Varmanas (c. 350–650 CE), Mlechchha dynasty (c. 655–900 CE) and Kamarupa-Palas (c. 900–1100 CE), from their capitals in present-day Guwahati (Pragjyotishpura), Tezpur (Haruppeswara) and North Gauhati (Durjaya) respectively. All three dynasties claimed their descent from Narakasura, an immigrant from Aryavarta. In the reign of the Varman king, Bhaskar Varman (c. 600–650 CE), the Chinese traveller Xuanzang visited the region and recorded his travels. Later, after weakening and disintegration (after the Kamarupa-Palas), the Kamarupa tradition was somewhat extended until c. 1255 CE by the Lunar I (c. 1120–1185 CE) and Lunar II (c. 1155–1255 CE) dynasties. The Kamarupa kingdom came to an end in the middle of the 13th century when the Khen dynasty under Sandhya of Kamarupanagara (North Guwahati), moved his capital to Kamatapur (North Bengal) after the invasion of Muslim Turks, and established the Kamata kingdom.

Pallava Empire 
The Pallavas, during the 4th to 9th centuries were, alongside the Guptas of the North, great patronisers of Sanskrit development in the South of the Indian subcontinent. The Pallava reign saw the first Sanskrit inscriptions in a script called Grantha. Early Pallavas had different connexions to Southeast Asian countries. The Pallavas used Dravidian architecture to build some very important Hindu temples and academies in Mamallapuram, Kanchipuram and other places; their rule saw the rise of great poets. The practice of dedicating temples to different deities came into vogue followed by fine artistic temple architecture and sculpture style of Vastu Shastra.

Pallavas reached the height of power during the reign of Mahendravarman I (571–630 CE) and Narasimhavarman I (630–668 CE) and dominated the Telugu and northern parts of the Tamil region for about six hundred years until the end of the 9th century.

Kadamba Empire 

Kadambas originated from Karnataka, was founded by Mayurasharma in 345 CE which at later times showed the potential of developing into imperial proportions, an indication to which is provided by the titles and epithets assumed by its rulers. King Mayurasharma defeated the armies of Pallavas of Kanchi possibly with help of some native tribes. The Kadamba fame reached its peak during the rule of Kakusthavarma, a notable ruler with whom even the kings of Gupta Dynasty of northern India cultivated marital alliances. The Kadambas were contemporaries of the Western Ganga Dynasty and together they formed the earliest native kingdoms to rule the land with absolute autonomy. The dynasty later continued to rule as a feudatory of larger Kannada empires, the Chalukya and the Rashtrakuta empires, for over five hundred years during which time they branched into minor dynasties known as the Kadambas of Goa, Kadambas of Halasi and Kadambas of Hangal.

Empire of Harsha 

Harsha ruled northern India from 606 to 647 CE. He was the son of Prabhakarvardhana and the younger brother of Rajyavardhana, who were members of the Vardhana dynasty and ruled Thanesar, in present-day Haryana.

After the downfall of the prior Gupta Empire in the middle of the 6th century, North India reverted to smaller republics and monarchical states. The power vacuum resulted in the rise of the Vardhanas of Thanesar, who began uniting the republics and monarchies from the Punjab to central India. After the death of Harsha's father and brother, representatives of the empire crowned Harsha emperor at an assembly in April 606 CE, giving him the title of Maharaja when he was merely 16 years old. At the height of his power, his Empire covered much of North and Northwestern India, extended East until Kamarupa, and South until Narmada River; and eventually made Kannauj (in present Uttar Pradesh state) his capital, and ruled until 647 CE.

The peace and prosperity that prevailed made his court a centre of cosmopolitanism, attracting scholars, artists and religious visitors from far and wide. During this time, Harsha converted to Buddhism from Surya worship. The Chinese traveller Xuanzang visited the court of Harsha and wrote a very favourable account of him, praising his justice and generosity. His biography Harshacharita ("Deeds of Harsha") written by Sanskrit poet Banabhatta, describes his association with Thanesar, besides mentioning the defence wall, a moat and the palace with a two-storied Dhavalagriha (White Mansion).

Early medieval period (mid 6th c.–1200 CE) 

Early medieval India began after the end of the Gupta Empire in the 6th century CE. This period also covers the "Late Classical Age" of Hinduism, which began after the end of the Gupta Empire, and the collapse of the Empire of Harsha in the 7th century CE; the beginning of Imperial Kannauj, leading to the Tripartite struggle; and ended in the 13th century with the rise of the Delhi Sultanate in Northern India and the end of the Later Cholas with the death of Rajendra Chola III in 1279 in Southern India; however some aspects of the Classical period continued until the fall of the Vijayanagara Empire in the south around the 17th century.

From the fifth century to the thirteenth, Śrauta sacrifices declined, and initiatory traditions of Buddhism, Jainism or more commonly Shaivism, Vaishnavism and Shaktism expanded in royal courts. This period produced some of India's finest art, considered the epitome of classical development, and the development of the main spiritual and philosophical systems which continued to be in Hinduism, Buddhism and Jainism.

In the 7th century CE, Kumārila Bhaṭṭa formulated his school of Mimamsa philosophy and defended the position on Vedic rituals against Buddhist attacks. Scholars note Bhaṭṭa's contribution to the decline of Buddhism in India. In the 8th century, Adi Shankara travelled across the Indian subcontinent to propagate and spread the doctrine of Advaita Vedanta, which he consolidated; and is credited with unifying the main characteristics of the current thoughts in Hinduism. He was a critic of both Buddhism and Minamsa school of Hinduism; and founded mathas (monasteries), in the four corners of the Indian subcontinent for the spread and development of Advaita Vedanta. While, Muhammad bin Qasim's invasion of Sindh (modern Pakistan) in 711 CE witnessed further decline of Buddhism. The Chach Nama records many instances of conversion of stupas to mosques such as at Nerun.

From the 8th to the 10th century, three dynasties contested for control of northern India: the Gurjara Pratiharas of Malwa, the Palas of Bengal, and the Rashtrakutas of the Deccan. The Sena dynasty would later assume control of the Pala Empire; the Gurjara Pratiharas fragmented into various states, notably the Paramaras of Malwa, the Chandelas of Bundelkhand, the Kalachuris of Mahakoshal, the Tomaras of Haryana, and the Chauhans of Rajputana, these states were some of the earliest Rajput kingdoms; while the Rashtrakutas were annexed by the Western Chalukyas. During this period, the Chaulukya dynasty emerged; the Chaulukyas constructed the Dilwara Temples, Modhera Sun Temple, Rani ki vav in the style of Māru-Gurjara architecture, and their capital Anhilwara (modern Patan, Gujarat) was one of the largest cities in the Indian subcontinent, with the population estimated at 100,000 in 1000 CE.

The Chola Empire emerged as a major power during the reign of Raja Raja Chola I and Rajendra Chola I who successfully invaded parts of Southeast Asia and Sri Lanka in the 11th century. Lalitaditya Muktapida (r. 724–760 CE) was an emperor of the Kashmiri Karkoṭa dynasty, which exercised influence in northwestern India from 625 CE until 1003, and was followed by Lohara dynasty. Kalhana in his Rajatarangini credits king Lalitaditya with leading an aggressive military campaign in Northern India and Central Asia.

The Hindu Shahi dynasty ruled portions of eastern Afghanistan, northern Pakistan, and Kashmir from the mid-7th century to the early 11th century. While in Odisha, the Eastern Ganga Empire rose to power; noted for the advancement of Hindu architecture, most notable being Jagannath Temple and Konark Sun Temple, as well as being patrons of art and literature.

Chalukya Empire 

The Chalukya Empire ruled large parts of southern and central India between the 6th and the 12th centuries. During this period, they ruled as three related yet individual dynasties. The earliest dynasty, known as the "Badami Chalukyas", ruled from Vatapi (modern Badami) from the middle of the 6th century. The Badami Chalukyas began to assert their independence at the decline of the Kadamba kingdom of Banavasi and rapidly rose to prominence during the reign of Pulakeshin II. The rule of the Chalukyas marks an important milestone in the history of South India and a golden age in the history of Karnataka. The political atmosphere in South India shifted from smaller kingdoms to large empires with the ascendancy of Badami Chalukyas. A Southern India-based kingdom took control and consolidated the entire region between the Kaveri and the Narmada rivers. The rise of this empire saw the birth of efficient administration, overseas trade and commerce and the development of new style of architecture called "Chalukyan architecture". The Chalukya dynasty ruled parts of southern and central India from Badami in Karnataka between 550 and 750, and then again from Kalyani between 970 and 1190.

Rashtrakuta Empire 

Founded by Dantidurga around 753, the Rashtrakuta Empire ruled from its capital at Manyakheta for almost two centuries. At its peak, the Rashtrakutas ruled from the Ganges River and Yamuna River doab in the north to Cape Comorin in the south, a fruitful time of political expansion, architectural achievements and famous literary contributions.

The early rulers of this dynasty were Hindu, but the later rulers were strongly influenced by Jainism. Govinda III and Amoghavarsha were the most famous of the long line of able administrators produced by the dynasty. Amoghavarsha, who ruled for 64 years, was also an author and wrote Kavirajamarga, the earliest known Kannada work on poetics. Architecture reached a milestone in the Dravidian style, the finest example of which is seen in the Kailasanath Temple at Ellora. Other important contributions are the Kashivishvanatha temple and the Jain Narayana temple at Pattadakal in Karnataka.

The Arab traveller Suleiman described the Rashtrakuta Empire as one of the four great Empires of the world. The Rashtrakuta period marked the beginning of the golden age of southern Indian mathematics. The great south Indian mathematician Mahāvīra lived in the Rashtrakuta Empire and his text had a huge impact on the medieval south Indian mathematicians who lived after him. The Rashtrakuta rulers also patronised men of letters, who wrote in a variety of languages from Sanskrit to the Apabhraṃśas.

Gurjara-Pratihara Empire 

The Gurjara-Pratiharas were instrumental in containing Arab armies moving east of the Indus River. Nagabhata I defeated the Arab army under Junaid and Tamin during the Umayyad campaigns in India. Under Nagabhata II, the Gurjara-Pratiharas became the most powerful dynasty in northern India. He was succeeded by his son Ramabhadra, who ruled briefly before being succeeded by his son, Mihira Bhoja. Under Bhoja and his successor Mahendrapala I, the Pratihara Empire reached its peak of prosperity and power. By the time of Mahendrapala, the extent of its territory rivalled that of the Gupta Empire stretching from the border of Sindh in the west to Bihar in the east and from the Himalayas in the north to around the Narmada River in the south. The expansion triggered a tripartite power struggle with the Rashtrakuta and Pala empires for control of the Indian subcontinent. During this period, Imperial Pratihara took the title of Maharajadhiraja of Āryāvarta (Great King of Kings of India).

By the end of the 10th century, several feudatories of the empire took advantage of the temporary weakness of the Gurjara-Pratiharas to declare their independence, notably the Paramaras of Malwa, the Chandelas of Bundelkhand, the Tomaras of Haryana, the Chauhans of Rajputana, and the Kalachuris of Mahakoshal.

Gahadavala dynasty 

Gahadavala dynasty ruled parts of the present-day Indian states of Uttar Pradesh and Bihar, during 11th and 12th centuries. Their capital was located at Varanasi in the Gangetic plains.

Khayaravala dynasty 

The Khayaravala dynasty, ruled parts of the present-day Indian states of Bihar and Jharkhand, during 11th and 12th centuries. Their capital was located at Khayaragarh in Shahabad district. Pratapdhavala and Shri Pratapa were king of the dynasty according to inscription of Rohtas.

Pala Empire 

The Pala Empire was founded by Gopala I. It was ruled by a Buddhist dynasty from Bengal in the eastern region of the Indian subcontinent. The Palas reunified Bengal after the fall of Shashanka's Gauda Kingdom.

The Palas were followers of the Mahayana and Tantric schools of Buddhism, they also patronised Shaivism and Vaishnavism. The morpheme Pala, meaning "protector", was used as an ending for the names of all the Pala monarchs. The empire reached its peak under Dharmapala and Devapala. Dharmapala is believed to have conquered Kanauj and extended his sway up to the farthest limits of India in the northwest.

The Pala Empire can be considered as the golden era of Bengal in many ways. Dharmapala founded the Vikramashila and revived Nalanda, considered one of the first great universities in recorded history. Nalanda reached its height under the patronage of the Pala Empire. The Palas also built many viharas. They maintained close cultural and commercial ties with countries of Southeast Asia and Tibet. Sea trade added greatly to the prosperity of the Pala Empire. The Arab merchant Suleiman notes the enormity of the Pala army in his memoirs.

Cholas 

Medieval Cholas rose to prominence during the middle of the 9th century CE and established the greatest empire South India had seen. They successfully united the South India under their rule and through their naval strength extended their influence in the Southeast Asian countries such as Srivijaya. Under Rajaraja Chola I and his successors Rajendra Chola I, Rajadhiraja Chola, Virarajendra Chola and Kulothunga Chola I the dynasty became a military, economic and cultural power in South Asia and South-East Asia. Rajendra Chola I's navies went even further, occupying the sea coasts from Burma to Vietnam, the Andaman and Nicobar Islands, the Lakshadweep (Laccadive) islands, Sumatra, and the Malay Peninsula in Southeast Asia and the Pegu islands. The power of the new empire was proclaimed to the eastern world by the expedition to the Ganges which Rajendra Chola I undertook and by the occupation of cities of the maritime empire of Srivijaya in Southeast Asia, as well as by the repeated embassies to China.

They dominated the political affairs of Sri Lanka for over two centuries through repeated invasions and occupation. They also had continuing trade contacts with the Arabs in the west and with the Chinese empire in the east. Rajaraja Chola I and his equally distinguished son Rajendra Chola I gave political unity to the whole of Southern India and established the Chola Empire as a respected sea power. Under the Cholas, the South India reached new heights of excellence in art, religion and literature. In all of these spheres, the Chola period marked the culmination of movements that had begun in an earlier age under the Pallavas. Monumental architecture in the form of majestic temples and sculpture in stone and bronze reached a finesse never before achieved in India.

Western Chalukya Empire 

The Western Chalukya Empire ruled most of the western Deccan, South India, between the 10th and 12th centuries. Vast areas between the Narmada River in the north and Kaveri River in the south came under Chalukya control. During this period the other major ruling families of the Deccan, the Hoysalas, the Seuna Yadavas of Devagiri, the Kakatiya dynasty and the Southern Kalachuris, were subordinates of the Western Chalukyas and gained their independence only when the power of the Chalukya waned during the latter half of the 12th century.

The Western Chalukyas developed an architectural style known today as a transitional style, an architectural link between the style of the early Chalukya dynasty and that of the later Hoysala empire. Most of its monuments are in the districts bordering the Tungabhadra River in central Karnataka. Well known examples are the Kasivisvesvara Temple at Lakkundi, the Mallikarjuna Temple at Kuruvatti, the Kallesvara Temple at Bagali, Siddhesvara Temple at Haveri, and the Mahadeva Temple at Itagi. This was an important period in the development of fine arts in Southern India, especially in literature as the Western Chalukya kings encouraged writers in the native language of Kannada, and Sanskrit like the philosopher and statesman Basava and the great mathematician Bhāskara II.

Late medieval period (c. 1200–1526 CE) 

The late medieval period is marked by repeated invasions of the Muslim Central Asian nomadic clans, the rule of the Delhi sultanate, and by the growth of other dynasties and empires, built upon military technology of the Sultanate.

Delhi Sultanate 

The Delhi Sultanate was a series of successive Islamic states based in Delhi, ruled by several dynasties of Turkic, Turko-Indian and Pashtun origins. It ruled large parts of the Indian subcontinent from the 13th century to the early 16th century. In the 12th and 13th centuries, Central Asian Turks invaded parts of northern India and established the Delhi Sultanate in the former Hindu holdings. The subsequent Mamluk dynasty of Delhi managed to conquer large areas of northern India, while the Khalji dynasty conquered most of central India while forcing the principal Hindu kingdoms of South India to become vassal states.

The Sultanate ushered in a period of Indian cultural renaissance. The resulting "Indo-Muslim" fusion of cultures left lasting syncretic monuments in architecture, music, literature, religion, and clothing. It is surmised that the language of Urdu was born during the Delhi Sultanate period as a result of the intermingling of the local speakers of Sanskritic Prakrits with immigrants speaking Persian, Turkic, and Arabic under the Muslim rulers. The Delhi Sultanate is the only Indo-Islamic empire to enthrone one of the few female rulers in India, Razia Sultana (1236–1240).

During the Delhi Sultanate, there was a synthesis between Indian civilisation and Islamic civilisation. The latter was a cosmopolitan civilisation, with a multicultural and pluralistic society, and wide-ranging international networks, including social and economic networks, spanning large parts of Afro-Eurasia, leading to escalating circulation of goods, peoples, technologies and ideas. While initially disruptive due to the passing of power from native Indian elites to Turkic Muslim elites, the Delhi Sultanate was responsible for integrating the Indian subcontinent into a growing world system, drawing India into a wider international network, which had a significant impact on Indian culture and society. However, the Delhi Sultanate also caused large-scale destruction and desecration of temples in the Indian subcontinent.

The Mongol invasions of India were successfully repelled by the Delhi Sultanate during the rule of Alauddin Khalji. A major factor in their success was their Turkic Mamluk slave army, who were highly skilled in the same style of nomadic cavalry warfare as the Mongols, as a result of having similar nomadic Central Asian roots. It is possible that the Mongol Empire may have expanded into India were it not for the Delhi Sultanate's role in repelling them. By repeatedly repulsing the Mongol raiders, the sultanate saved India from the devastation visited on West and Central Asia, setting the scene for centuries of migration of fleeing soldiers, learned men, mystics, traders, artists, and artisans from that region into the subcontinent, thereby creating a syncretic Indo-Islamic culture in the north.

A Turco-Mongol conqueror in Central Asia, Timur (Tamerlane), attacked the reigning Sultan Nasir-u Din Mehmud of the Tughlaq dynasty in the north Indian city of Delhi. The Sultan's army was defeated on 17 December 1398. Timur entered Delhi and the city was sacked, destroyed, and left in ruins after Timur's army had killed and plundered for three days and nights. He ordered the whole city to be sacked except for the sayyids, scholars, and the "other Muslims" (artists); 100,000 war prisoners were put to death in one day. The Sultanate suffered significantly from the sacking of Delhi. Though revived briefly under the Lodi dynasty, it was but a shadow of the former.

Vijayanagara Empire 

The Vijayanagara Empire was established in 1336 by Harihara I and his brother Bukka Raya I of Sangama Dynasty, which originated as a political heir of the Hoysala Empire, Kakatiya Empire, and the Pandyan Empire. The empire rose to prominence as a culmination of attempts by the south Indian powers to ward off Islamic invasions by the end of the 13th century. It lasted until 1646, although its power declined after a major military defeat in 1565 by the combined armies of the Deccan sultanates. The empire is named after its capital city of Vijayanagara, whose ruins surround present day Hampi, now a World Heritage Site in Karnataka, India.

In the first two decades after the founding of the empire, Harihara I gained control over most of the area south of the Tungabhadra river and earned the title of Purvapaschima Samudradhishavara ("master of the eastern and western seas"). By 1374 Bukka Raya I, successor to Harihara I, had defeated the chiefdom of Arcot, the Reddys of Kondavidu, and the Sultan of Madurai and had gained control over Goa in the west and the Tungabhadra-Krishna River doab in the north.

With the Vijayanagara Kingdom now imperial in stature, Harihara II, the second son of Bukka Raya I, further consolidated the kingdom beyond the Krishna River and brought the whole of South India under the Vijayanagara umbrella. The next ruler, Deva Raya I, emerged successful against the Gajapatis of Odisha and undertook important works of fortification and irrigation. Italian traveler Niccolo de Conti wrote of him as the most powerful ruler of India. Deva Raya II (called Gajabetekara) succeeded to the throne in 1424 and was possibly the most capable of the Sangama Dynasty rulers. He quelled rebelling feudal lords as well as the Zamorin of Calicut and Quilon in the south. He invaded the island of Sri Lanka and became overlord of the kings of Burma at Pegu and Tanasserim.

The Vijayanagara Emperors were tolerant of all religions and sects, as writings by foreign visitors show. The kings used titles such as Gobrahamana Pratipalanacharya (literally, "protector of cows and Brahmins") and Hindurayasuratrana (lit, "upholder of Hindu faith") that testified to their intention of protecting Hinduism and yet were at the same time staunchly Islamicate in their court ceremonials and dress. The empire's founders, Harihara I and Bukka Raya I, were devout Shaivas (worshippers of Shiva), but made grants to the Vaishnava order of Sringeri with Vidyaranya as their patron saint, and designated Varaha (the boar, an Avatar of Vishnu) as their emblem. Excavations have found several "Islamic quarters" in the capital. Nobles from Central Asia's Timurid kingdoms also came to Vijayanagara. The later Saluva and Tuluva kings were Vaishnava by faith, but worshipped at the feet of Lord Virupaksha (Shiva) at Hampi as well as Lord Venkateshwara (Vishnu) at Tirupati. A Sanskrit work, Jambavati Kalyanam by King Krishnadevaraya, called Lord Virupaksha Karnata Rajya Raksha Mani ("protective jewel of Karnata Empire"). The kings patronised the saints of the dvaita order (philosophy of dualism) of Madhvacharya at Udupi.

The empire's legacy includes many monuments spread over South India, the best known of which is the group at Hampi. The previous temple building traditions in South India came together in the Vijayanagara Architecture style. The mingling of all faiths and vernaculars inspired architectural innovation of Hindu temple construction, first in the Deccan and later in the Dravidian idioms using the local granite. South Indian mathematics flourished under the protection of the Vijayanagara Empire in Kerala. The south Indian mathematician Madhava of Sangamagrama founded the famous Kerala School of Astronomy and Mathematics in the 14th century which produced a lot of great south Indian mathematicians like Parameshvara, Nilakantha Somayaji and Jyeṣṭhadeva in medieval south India. Efficient administration and vigorous overseas trade brought new technologies such as water management systems for irrigation. The empire's patronage enabled fine arts and literature to reach new heights in Kannada, Telugu, Tamil, and Sanskrit, while Carnatic music evolved into its current form.

Vijayanagara went into decline after the defeat in the Battle of Talikota (1565). After the death of Aliya Rama Raya in the Battle of Talikota, Tirumala Deva Raya started the Aravidu dynasty, moved and founded a new capital of Penukonda to replace the destroyed Hampi, and attempted to reconstitute the remains of Vijayanagara Empire. Tirumala abdicated in 1572, dividing the remains of his kingdom to his three sons, and pursued a religious life until his death in 1578. The Aravidu dynasty successors ruled the region but the empire collapsed in 1614, and the final remains ended in 1646, from continued wars with the Bijapur sultanate and others. During this period, more kingdoms in South India became independent and separate from Vijayanagara. These include the Mysore Kingdom, Keladi Nayaka, Nayaks of Madurai, Nayaks of Tanjore, Nayakas of Chitradurga and Nayak Kingdom of Gingee – all of which declared independence and went on to have a significant impact on the history of South India in the coming centuries.

Other kingdoms 

For two and a half centuries from the mid-13th century, politics in Northern India was dominated by the Delhi Sultanate, and in Southern India by the Vijayanagar Empire. However, there were other regional powers present as well. After fall of Pala Empire, the Chero dynasty ruled much of Eastern Uttar Pradesh, Bihar and Jharkhand from 12th CE to 18th CE. The Reddy dynasty successfully defeated the Delhi Sultanate; and extended their rule from Cuttack in the north to Kanchi in the south, eventually being absorbed into the expanding Vijayanagara Empire.

In the north, the Rajput kingdoms remained the dominant force in Western and Central India. The Mewar dynasty under Maharana Hammir defeated and captured Muhammad Tughlaq with the Bargujars as his main allies. Tughlaq had to pay a huge ransom and relinquish all of Mewar's lands. After this event, the Delhi Sultanate did not attack Chittor for a few hundred years. The Rajputs re-established their independence, and Rajput states were established as far east as Bengal and north into the Punjab. The Tomaras established themselves at Gwalior, and Man Singh Tomar reconstructed the Gwalior Fort which still stands there. During this period, Mewar emerged as the leading Rajput state; and Rana Kumbha expanded his kingdom at the expense of the Sultanates of Malwa and Gujarat. The next great Rajput ruler, Rana Sanga of Mewar, became the principal player in Northern India. His objectives grew in scope – he planned to conquer the much sought after prize of the Muslim rulers of the time, Delhi. But, his defeat in the Battle of Khanwa consolidated the new Mughal dynasty in India. The Mewar dynasty under Maharana Udai Singh II faced further defeat by Mughal emperor Akbar, with their capital Chittor being captured. Due to this event, Udai Singh II founded Udaipur, which became the new capital of the Mewar kingdom. His son, Maharana Pratap of Mewar, firmly resisted the Mughals. Akbar sent many missions against him. He survived to ultimately gain control of all of Mewar, excluding the Chittor Fort.

In the south, the Bahmani Sultanate, which was established either by a Brahman convert or patronised by a Brahman and from that source it was given the name Bahmani, was the chief rival of the Vijayanagara, and frequently created difficulties for the Vijayanagara. In the early 16th century Krishnadevaraya of the Vijayanagar Empire defeated the last remnant of Bahmani Sultanate power. After which, the Bahmani Sultanate collapsed, resulting it being split into five small Deccan sultanates. In 1490, Ahmadnagar declared independence, followed by Bijapur and Berar in the same year; Golkonda became independent in 1518 and Bidar in 1528. Although generally rivals, they did ally against the Vijayanagara Empire in 1565, permanently weakening Vijayanagar in the Battle of Talikota.

In the East, the Gajapati Kingdom remained a strong regional power to reckon with, associated with a high point in the growth of regional culture and architecture. Under Kapilendradeva, Gajapatis became an empire stretching from the lower Ganga in the north to the Kaveri in the south. In Northeast India, the Ahom Kingdom was a major power for six centuries; led by Lachit Borphukan, the Ahoms decisively defeated the Mughal army at the Battle of Saraighat during the Ahom-Mughal conflicts. Further east in Northeastern India was the Kingdom of Manipur, which ruled from their seat of power at Kangla Fort and developed a sophisticated Hindu Gaudiya Vaishnavite culture.

The Sultanate of Bengal was the dominant power of the Ganges–Brahmaputra Delta, with a network of mint towns spread across the region. It was a Sunni Muslim monarchy with Indo-Turkic, Arab, Abyssinian and Bengali Muslim elites. The sultanate was known for its religious pluralism where non-Muslim communities co-existed peacefully. The Bengal Sultanate had a circle of vassal states, including Odisha in the southwest, Arakan in the southeast, and Tripura in the east. In the early 16th century, the Bengal Sultanate reached the peak of its territorial growth with control over Kamrup and Kamata in the northeast and Jaunpur and Bihar in the west. It was reputed as a thriving trading nation and one of Asia's strongest states.The Bengal Sultanate was described by contemporary European and Chinese visitors as a relatively prosperous kingdom. Due to the abundance of goods in Bengal, the region was described as the "richest country to trade with". The Bengal Sultanate left a strong architectural legacy. Buildings from the period show foreign influences merged into a distinct Bengali style. The Bengal Sultanate was also the largest and most prestigious authority among the independent medieval Muslim-ruled states in the history of Bengal. Its decline began with an interregnum by the Suri Empire, followed by Mughal conquest and disintegration into petty kingdoms.

Bhakti movement and Sikhism 

The Bhakti movement refers to the theistic devotional trend that emerged in medieval Hinduism and later revolutionised in Sikhism. It originated in the seventh-century south India (now parts of Tamil Nadu and Kerala), and spread northwards. It swept over east and north India from the 15th century onwards, reaching its zenith between the 15th and 17th century CE.
 The Bhakti movement regionally developed around different gods and goddesses, such as Vaishnavism (Vishnu), Shaivism (Shiva), Shaktism (Shakti goddesses), and Smartism. The movement was inspired by many poet-saints, who championed a wide range of philosophical positions ranging from theistic dualism of Dvaita to absolute monism of Advaita Vedanta.
 Sikhism is based on the spiritual teachings of Guru Nanak, the first Guru, and the ten successive Sikh gurus. After the death of the tenth Guru, Guru Gobind Singh, the Sikh scripture, Guru Granth Sahib, became the literal embodiment of the eternal, impersonal Guru, where the scripture's word serves as the spiritual guide for Sikhs.
 Buddhism in India flourished in the Himalayan kingdoms of Namgyal Kingdom in Ladakh, Sikkim Kingdom in Sikkim, and Chutia Kingdom in Arunachal Pradesh of the Late medieval period.

Early modern period (c. 1526–1858 CE) 
The early modern period of Indian history is dated from 1526 CE to 1858 CE, corresponding to the rise and fall of the Mughal Empire, which inherited from the Timurid Renaissance. During this age India's economy expanded, relative peace was maintained and arts were patronized. This period witnessed the further development of Indo-Islamic architecture; the growth of Mahrattas and Sikhs enabled them to rule significant regions of India in the waning days of the Mughal empire, which formally came to an end when the British Raj was founded. With the discovery of the Cape route in the 1500s, the first Europeans to arrive by sea and establish themselves, were the Portuguese in Goa and Bombay.

Mughal Empire 

In 1526, Babur, a Timurid descendant of Timur and Genghis Khan from Fergana Valley (modern day Uzbekistan), swept across the Khyber Pass and established the Mughal Empire, which at its zenith covered much of South Asia. However, his son Humayun was defeated by the Afghan warrior Sher Shah Suri in the year 1540, and Humayun was forced to retreat to Kabul. After Sher Shah's death, his son Islam Shah Suri and his Hindu general Hemu Vikramaditya established secular rule in North India from Delhi until 1556, when Akbar, grandson of Babur, defeated Hemu in the Second Battle of Panipat on 6 November 1556 after winning Battle of Delhi. Akbar tried to establish a good relationship with the Hindus. Akbar declared "Amari" or non-killing of animals in the holy days of Jainism. He rolled back the jizya tax for non-Muslims. The Mughal emperors married local royalty, allied themselves with local maharajas, and attempted to fuse their Turko-Persian culture with ancient Indian styles, creating a unique Indo-Persian culture and Indo-Saracenic architecture.

Akbar married a Rajput princess, Mariam-uz-Zamani, and they had a son, Jahangir, who was part-Mughal and part-Rajput, as were future Mughal emperors. Jahangir more or less followed his father's policy. The Mughal dynasty ruled most of the Indian subcontinent by 1600. The reign of Shah Jahan was the golden age of Mughal architecture. He erected several large monuments, the most famous of which is the Taj Mahal at Agra, as well as the Moti Masjid in Agra, the Red Fort, the Jama Masjid, Delhi, and the Lahore Fort.

It was one of the largest empires to have existed in the Indian subcontinent, and surpassed China to become the world's largest economic power, controlling 24.4% of the world economy, and the world leader in manufacturing, producing 25% of global industrial output. The economic and demographic upsurge was stimulated by Mughal agrarian reforms that intensified agricultural production, and a relatively high degree of urbanisation for its time.

The Mughal Empire reached the zenith of its territorial expanse during the reign of Aurangzeb, under whose reign the proto-industrialization was waved and India surpassed Qing China in becoming the world's largest economy. Aurangzeb was less tolerant than his predecessors, reintroducing the jizya tax and destroying several historical temples, while at the same time building more Hindu temples than he destroyed, employing significantly more Hindus in his imperial bureaucracy than his predecessors, and advancing administrators based on their ability rather than their religion. However, he is often blamed for the erosion of the tolerant syncretic tradition of his predecessors, as well as increasing religious controversy and centralisation. The English East India Company suffered a defeat at the Anglo-Mughal War.

The empire went into decline thereafter. The Mughals suffered several blows due to invasions from Marathas, Rajputs, Jats and Afghans. In 1737, the Maratha general Bajirao of the Maratha Empire invaded and plundered Delhi. Under the general Amir Khan Umrao Al Udat, the Mughal Emperor sent 8,000 troops to drive away the 5,000 Maratha cavalry soldiers. Baji Rao, however, easily routed the novice Mughal general and the rest of the imperial Mughal army fled. In 1737, in the final defeat of Mughal Empire, the commander-in-chief of the Mughal Army, Nizam-ul-mulk, was routed at Bhopal by the Maratha army. This essentially brought an end to the Mughal Empire. While Bharatpur State under Jat ruler Suraj Mal, overran the Mughal garrison at Agra and plundered the city taking with them the two great silver doors of the entrance of the famous Taj Mahal; which were then melted down by Suraj Mal in 1761. In 1739, Nader Shah, emperor of Iran, defeated the Mughal army at the Battle of Karnal. After this victory, Nader captured and sacked Delhi, carrying away many treasures, including the Peacock Throne. Mughal rule was further weakened by constant native Indian resistance; Banda Singh Bahadur led the Sikh Khalsa against Mughal religious oppression; Hindu Rajas of Bengal, Pratapaditya and Raja Sitaram Ray revolted; and Maharaja Chhatrasal, of Bundela Rajputs, fought the Mughals and established the Panna State. The Mughal dynasty was reduced to puppet rulers by 1757. Vadda Ghalughara took place under the Muslim provincial government based at Lahore to wipe out the Sikhs, with 30,000 Sikhs being killed, an offensive that had begun with the Mughals, with the Chhota Ghallughara, and lasted several decades under its Muslim successor states.

Maratha Empire 

The Maratha kingdom was founded and consolidated by Chatrapati Shivaji, a Maratha aristocrat of the Bhonsle clan. However, the credit for making the Marathas formidable power nationally goes to Peshwa (chief minister) Bajirao I. Historian K.K. Datta wrote that Bajirao I "may very well be regarded as the second founder of the Maratha Empire".

In the early 18th century, under the Peshwas, the Marathas consolidated and ruled over much of South Asia. The Marathas are credited to a large extent for ending Mughal rule in India. In 1737, the Marathas defeated a Mughal army in their capital, in the Battle of Delhi. The Marathas continued their military campaigns against the Mughals, Nizam, Nawab of Bengal and the Durrani Empire to further extend their boundaries. By 1760, the domain of the Marathas stretched across most of the Indian subcontinent. The Marathas even attempted to capture Delhi and discussed putting Vishwasrao Peshwa on the throne there in place of the Mughal emperor.

The Maratha empire at its peak stretched from Tamil Nadu in the south, to Peshawar (modern-day Khyber Pakhtunkhwa, Pakistan ) in the north, and Bengal in the east. The Northwestern expansion of the Marathas was stopped after the Third Battle of Panipat (1761). However, the Maratha authority in the north was re-established within a decade under Peshwa Madhavrao I.

Under Madhavrao I, the strongest knights were granted semi-autonomy, creating a confederacy of United Maratha states under the Gaekwads of Baroda, the Holkars of Indore and Malwa, the Scindias of Gwalior and Ujjain, the Bhonsales of Nagpur and the Puars of Dhar and Dewas. In 1775, the East India Company intervened in a Peshwa family succession struggle in Pune, which led to the First Anglo-Maratha War, resulting in a Maratha victory. The Marathas remained a major power in India until their defeat in the Second and Third Anglo-Maratha Wars (1805–1818), which resulted in the East India Company controlling most of India.

Sikh Empire 

The Sikh Empire, ruled by members of the Sikh religion, was a political entity that governed the Northwestern regions of the Indian subcontinent. The empire, based around the Punjab region, existed from 1799 to 1849. It was forged, on the foundations of the Khalsa, under the leadership of Maharaja Ranjit Singh (1780–1839) from an array of autonomous Punjabi Misls of the Sikh Confederacy.

Maharaja Ranjit Singh consolidated many parts of northern India into an empire. He primarily used his Sikh Khalsa Army that he trained in European military techniques and equipped with modern military technologies. Ranjit Singh proved himself to be a master strategist and selected well-qualified generals for his army. He continuously defeated the Afghan armies and successfully ended the Afghan-Sikh Wars. In stages, he added central Punjab, the provinces of Multan and Kashmir, and the Peshawar Valley to his empire.

At its peak, in the 19th century, the empire extended from the Khyber Pass in the west, to Kashmir in the north, to Sindh in the south, running along Sutlej river to Himachal in the east. After the death of Ranjit Singh, the empire weakened, leading to conflict with the British East India Company. The hard-fought First Anglo-Sikh War and Second Anglo-Sikh War marked the downfall of the Sikh Empire, making it among the last areas of the Indian subcontinent to be conquered by the British.

Other kingdoms 

The Kingdom of Mysore in southern India expanded to its greatest extent under Hyder Ali and his son Tipu Sultan in the later half of the 18th century. Under their rule, Mysore fought series of wars against the Marathas and British or their combined forces. The Maratha–Mysore War ended in April 1787, following the finalizing of treaty of Gajendragad, in which, Tipu Sultan was obligated to pay tribute to the Marathas. Concurrently, the Anglo-Mysore Wars took place, where the Mysoreans used the Mysorean rockets. The Fourth Anglo-Mysore War (1798–1799) saw the death of Tipu. Mysore's alliance with the French was seen as a threat to the British East India Company, and Mysore was attacked from all four sides. The Nizam of Hyderabad and the Marathas launched an invasion from the north. The British won a decisive victory at the Siege of Seringapatam (1799).

Hyderabad was founded by the Qutb Shahi dynasty of Golconda in 1591. Following a brief Mughal rule, Asif Jah, a Mughal official, seized control of Hyderabad and declared himself Nizam-al-Mulk of Hyderabad in 1724. The Nizams lost considerable territory and paid tribute to the Maratha Empire after being routed in multiple battles, such as the Battle of Palkhed. However, the Nizams maintained their sovereignty from 1724 until 1948 through paying tributes to the Marathas, and later, being vassels of the British. Hyderabad State became a princely state in British India in 1798.

The Nawabs of Bengal had become the de facto rulers of Bengal following the decline of Mughal Empire. However, their rule was interrupted by Marathas who carried out six expeditions in Bengal from 1741 to 1748, as a result of which Bengal became a tributary state of Marathas. On 23 June 1757, Siraj ud-Daulah, the last independent Nawab of Bengal was betrayed in the Battle of Plassey by Mir Jafar. He lost to the British, who took over the charge of Bengal in 1757, installed Mir Jafar on the Masnad (throne) and established itself to a political power in Bengal. In 1765 the system of Dual Government was established, in which the Nawabs ruled on behalf of the British and were mere puppets to the British. In 1772 the system was abolished and Bengal was brought under the direct control of the British. In 1793, when the Nizamat (governorship) of the Nawab was also taken away from them, they remained as the mere pensioners of the British East India Company.

In the 18th century, the whole of Rajputana was virtually subdued by the Marathas. The Second Anglo-Maratha War distracted the Marathas from 1807 to 1809, but afterward Maratha domination of Rajputana resumed. In 1817, the British went to war with the Pindaris, raiders who were fled in Maratha territory, which quickly became the Third Anglo-Maratha War, and the British government offered its protection to the Rajput rulers from the Pindaris and the Marathas. By the end of 1818 similar treaties had been executed between the other Rajput states and Britain. The Maratha Sindhia ruler of Gwalior gave up the district of Ajmer-Merwara to the British, and Maratha influence in Rajasthan came to an end. Most of the Rajput princes remained loyal to Britain in the Revolt of 1857, and few political changes were made in Rajputana until Indian independence in 1947. The Rajputana Agency contained more than 20 princely states, most notable being Udaipur State, Jaipur State, Bikaner State and Jodhpur State.

After the fall of the Maratha Empire, many Maratha dynasties and states became vassals in a subsidiary alliance with the British, to form the largest bloc of princely states in the British Raj, in terms of territory and population. With the decline of the Sikh Empire, after the First Anglo-Sikh War in 1846, under the terms of the Treaty of Amritsar, the British government sold Kashmir to Maharaja Gulab Singh and the princely state of Jammu and Kashmir, the second-largest princely state in British India, was created by the Dogra dynasty. While in Eastern and Northeastern India, the Hindu and Buddhist states of Cooch Behar Kingdom, Twipra Kingdom and Kingdom of Sikkim were annexed by the British and made vassal princely state.

After the fall of the Vijayanagara Empire, Polygar states emerged in Southern India; and managed to weather invasions and flourished until the Polygar Wars, where they were defeated by the British East India Company forces. Around the 18th century, the Kingdom of Nepal was formed by Rajput rulers.

European exploration 

In 1498, a Portuguese fleet under Vasco da Gama discovered a new sea route from Europe to India, which paved the way for direct Indo-European commerce. The Portuguese soon set up trading posts in Velha Goa, Damaon, Dio island, and Bombay. After their conquest in Goa, the Portuguese instituted the Goa Inquisition, where new Indian converts were punished for suspected heresy against Christianity and non-Christians were condemned for discouraging those considering conversion or for convincing others to renounce Christianity. Goa remained the main Portuguese territory until it was annexed by India in 1961.

The next to arrive were the Dutch, with their main base in Ceylon. They established ports in Malabar. However, their expansion into India was halted after their defeat in the Battle of Colachel by the Kingdom of Travancore during the Travancore-Dutch War. The Dutch never recovered from the defeat and no longer posed a large colonial threat to India.

The internal conflicts among Indian kingdoms gave opportunities to the European traders to gradually establish political influence and appropriate lands. Following the Dutch, the British—who set up in the west coast port of Surat in 1619—and the French both established trading outposts in India. Although these continental European powers controlled various coastal regions of southern and eastern India during the ensuing century, they eventually lost all their territories in India to the British, with the exception of the French outposts of Pondichéry and Chandernagore, and the Portuguese colonies of Goa, Damaon& Diu.

East India Company rule in India 

The English East India Company was founded in 1600 as The Company of Merchants of London Trading into the East Indies. It gained a foothold in India with the establishment of a factory in Masulipatnam on the Eastern coast of India in 1611 and a grant of rights by the Mughal emperor Jahangir to establish a factory in Surat in 1612. In 1640, after receiving similar permission from the Vijayanagara ruler farther south, a second factory was established in Madras on the southeastern coast. The islet of Bom Bahia in present-day Mumbai (Bombay), was a Portuguese outpost not far from Surat, it was presented to Charles II of England as dowry, in his marriage to Catherine of Braganza, Charles in turn leased Bombay to the Company in 1668. Two decades later, the company established a trade post in the River Ganges delta, when a factory was set up in Calcutta (Kolkata). During this time other companies established by the Portuguese, Dutch, French, and Danish were similarly expanding in the sub-continent.

The company's victory under Robert Clive in the 1757 Battle of Plassey and another victory in the 1764 Battle of Buxar (in Bihar), consolidated the company's power, and forced emperor Shah Alam II to appoint it the diwan, or revenue collector, of Bengal, Bihar, and Orissa. The company thus became the de facto ruler of large areas of the lower Gangetic plain by 1773. It also proceeded by degrees to expand its dominions around Bombay and Madras. The Anglo-Mysore Wars (1766–99) and the Anglo-Maratha Wars (1772–1818) left it in control of large areas of India south of the Sutlej River. With the defeat of the Marathas, no native power represented a threat for the company any longer.

The expansion of the company's power chiefly took two forms. The first of these was the outright annexation of Indian states and subsequent direct governance of the underlying regions that collectively came to comprise British India. The annexed regions included the North-Western Provinces (comprising Rohilkhand, Gorakhpur, and the Doab) (1801), Delhi (1803), Assam (Ahom Kingdom 1828) and Sindh (1843). Punjab, North-West Frontier Province, and Kashmir were annexed after the Anglo-Sikh Wars in 1849–56 (Period of tenure of Marquess of Dalhousie Governor General). However, Kashmir was immediately sold under the Treaty of Amritsar (1850) to the Dogra Dynasty of Jammu and thereby became a princely state. In 1854, Berar was annexed along with the state of Oudh two years later.

The second form of asserting power involved treaties in which Indian rulers acknowledged the company's hegemony in return for limited internal autonomy. Since the company operated under financial constraints, it had to set up political underpinnings for its rule. The most important such support came from the subsidiary alliances with Indian princes during the first 75 years of Company rule. In the early 19th century, the territories of these princes accounted for two-thirds of India. When an Indian ruler who was able to secure his territory wanted to enter such an alliance, the company welcomed it as an economical method of indirect rule that did not involve the economic costs of direct administration or the political costs of gaining the support of alien subjects.

In return, the company undertook the "defense of these subordinate allies and treated them with traditional respect and marks of honor." Subsidiary alliances created the Princely States of the Hindu maharajas and the Muslim nawabs. Prominent among the princely states were Cochin (1791), Jaipur (1794), Travancore (1795), Hyderabad (1798), Mysore (1799), Cis-Sutlej Hill States (1815), Central India Agency (1819), Cutch and Gujarat Gaikwad territories (1819), Rajputana (1818) and Bahawalpur (1833).

Indian indenture system 

The Indian indenture system was an ongoing system of indenture, a form of debt bondage, by which 3.5 million Indians were transported to various colonies of European powers to provide labor for the (mainly sugar) plantations. It started from the end of slavery in 1833 and continued until 1920. This resulted in the development of a large Indian diaspora that spread from the Caribbean (e.g. Trinidad and Tobago) to the Pacific Ocean (e.g. Fiji) and the growth of large Indo-Caribbean and Indo-African populations.

Modern period and independence (after c. 1850 CE)

Rebellion of 1857 and its consequences 

The Indian rebellion of 1857 was a large-scale rebellion by soldiers employed by the British East India Company in northern and central India against the company's rule. The spark that led to the mutiny was the issue of new gunpowder cartridges for the Enfield rifle, which was insensitive to local religious prohibition. The key mutineer was Mangal Pandey. In addition, the underlying grievances over British taxation, the ethnic gulf between the British officers and their Indian troops and land annexations played a significant role in the rebellion. Within weeks after Pandey's mutiny, dozens of units of the Indian army joined peasant armies in widespread rebellion. The rebel soldiers were later joined by Indian nobility, many of whom had lost titles and domains under the Doctrine of Lapse and felt that the company had interfered with a traditional system of inheritance. Rebel leaders such as Nana Sahib and the Rani of Jhansi belonged to this group.

After the outbreak of the mutiny in Meerut, the rebels very quickly reached Delhi. The rebels had also captured large tracts of the North-Western Provinces and Awadh (Oudh). Most notably, in Awadh, the rebellion took on the attributes of a patriotic revolt against British presence. However, the British East India Company mobilised rapidly with the assistance of friendly Princely states, but it took the British the remainder of 1857 and the better part of 1858 to suppress the rebellion. Due to the rebels being poorly equipped and having no outside support or funding, they were brutally subdued by the British.

In the aftermath, all power was transferred from the British East India Company to the British Crown, which began to administer most of India as a number of provinces. The Crown controlled the company's lands directly and had considerable indirect influence over the rest of India, which consisted of the Princely states ruled by local royal families. There were officially 565 princely states in 1947, but only 21 had actual state governments, and only three were large (Mysore, Hyderabad, and Kashmir). They were absorbed into the independent nation in 1947–48.

British Raj (1858–1947) 

After 1857, the colonial government strengthened and expanded its infrastructure via the court system, legal procedures, and statutes. The Indian Penal Code came into being. In education, Thomas Babington Macaulay had made schooling a priority for the Raj in his famous minute of February 1835 and succeeded in implementing the use of English as the medium of instruction. By 1890 some 60,000 Indians had matriculated. The Indian economy grew at about 1% per year from 1880 to 1920, and the population also grew at 1%. However, from 1910s Indian private industry began to grow significantly. India built a modern railway system in the late 19th century which was the fourth largest in the world. The British Raj invested heavily in infrastructure, including canals and irrigation systems in addition to railways, telegraphy, roads and ports. However, historians have been bitterly divided on issues of economic history, with the Nationalist school arguing that India was poorer at the end of British rule than at the beginning and that impoverishment occurred because of the British.

In 1905, Lord Curzon split the large province of Bengal into a largely Hindu western half and "Eastern Bengal and Assam", a largely Muslim eastern half. The British goal was said to be for efficient administration but the people of Bengal were outraged at the apparent "divide and rule" strategy. It also marked the beginning of the organised anti-colonial movement. When the Liberal party in Britain came to power in 1906, he was removed. Bengal was reunified in 1911. The new Viceroy Gilbert Minto and the new Secretary of State for India John Morley consulted with Congress leaders on political reforms. The Morley-Minto reforms of 1909 provided for Indian membership of the provincial executive councils as well as the Viceroy's executive council. The Imperial Legislative Council was enlarged from 25 to 60 members and separate communal representation for Muslims was established in a dramatic step towards representative and responsible government. Several socio-religious organisations came into being at that time. Muslims set up the All India Muslim League in 1906. It was not a mass party but was designed to protect the interests of the aristocratic Muslims. It was internally divided by conflicting loyalties to Islam, the British, and India, and by distrust of Hindus. The Hindu Mahasabha and Rashtriya Swayamsevak Sangh (RSS) sought to represent Hindu interests though the latter always claimed it to be a "cultural" organisation. Sikhs founded the Shiromani Akali Dal in 1920. However, the largest and oldest political party Indian National Congress, founded in 1885, attempted to keep a distance from the socio-religious movements and identity politics.

Indian Renaissance 

The Bengali Renaissance refers to a social reform movement, dominated by Bengali Hindus, in the Bengal region of the Indian subcontinent during the nineteenth and early twentieth centuries, a period of British rule. Historian Nitish Sengupta describes the renaissance as having started with reformer and humanitarian Raja Ram Mohan Roy (1775–1833), and ended with Asia's first Nobel laureate Rabindranath Tagore (1861–1941). This flowering of religious and social reformers, scholars, and writers is described by historian David Kopf as "one of the most creative periods in Indian history."

During this period, Bengal witnessed an intellectual awakening that is in some way similar to the Renaissance. This movement questioned existing orthodoxies, particularly with respect to women, marriage, the dowry system, the caste system, and religion. One of the earliest social movements that emerged during this time was the Young Bengal movement, which espoused rationalism and atheism as the common denominators of civil conduct among upper caste educated Hindus. It played an important role in reawakening Indian minds and intellect across the Indian subcontinent.

Famines 

During British East India Company and British Crown rule, India experienced some of deadliest ever recorded famines. These famines, usually resulting from crop failures due to El Niño and often exacerbated by policies of the colonial government, included the Great Famine of 1876–1878 in which 6.1 million to 10.3 million people died, the Great Bengal famine of 1770 where between 1 and 10 million people died, the Indian famine of 1899–1900 in which 1.25 to 10 million people died, and the Bengal famine of 1943 where between 2.1 and 3.8 million people died. The Third plague pandemic in the mid-19th century killed 10 million people in India. Despite persistent diseases and famines, the population of the Indian subcontinent, which stood at up to 200 million in 1750, had reached 389 million by 1941.

World War I 

During World War I, over 800,000 volunteered for the army, and more than 400,000 volunteered for non-combat roles, compared with the pre-war annual recruitment of about 15,000 men. The Army saw action on the Western Front within a month of the start of the war at the First Battle of Ypres. After a year of front-line duty, sickness and casualties had reduced the Indian Corps to the point where it had to be withdrawn. Nearly 700,000 Indians fought the Turks in the Mesopotamian campaign. Indian formations were also sent to East Africa, Egypt, and Gallipoli.

Indian Army and Imperial Service Troops fought during the Sinai and Palestine Campaign's defence of the Suez Canal in 1915, at Romani in 1916 and to Jerusalem in 1917. India units occupied the Jordan Valley and after the German spring offensive they became the major force in the Egyptian Expeditionary Force during the Battle of Megiddo and in the Desert Mounted Corps' advance to Damascus and on to Aleppo. Other divisions remained in India guarding the North-West Frontier and fulfilling internal security obligations.

One million Indian troops served abroad during the war. In total, 74,187 died, and another 67,000 were wounded. The roughly 90,000 soldiers who died fighting in World War I and the Afghan Wars are commemorated by the India Gate.

World War II 

British India officially declared war on Nazi Germany in September 1939. The British Raj, as part of the Allied Nations, sent over two and a half million volunteer soldiers to fight under British command against the Axis powers. Additionally, several Indian Princely States provided large donations to support the Allied campaign during the War. India also provided the base for American operations in support of China in the China Burma India Theatre.

Indians fought with distinction throughout the world, including in the European theatre against Germany, in North Africa against Germany and Italy, against the Italians in East Africa, in the Middle East against the Vichy French, in the South Asian region defending India against the Japanese and fighting the Japanese in Burma. Indians also aided in liberating British colonies such as Singapore and Hong Kong after the Japanese surrender in August 1945. Over 87,000 soldiers from the subcontinent died in World War II.

The Indian National Congress, denounced Nazi Germany but would not fight it or anyone else until India was independent. Congress launched the Quit India Movement in August 1942, refusing to co-operate in any way with the government until independence was granted. The government was ready for this move. It immediately arrested over 60,000 national and local Congress leaders. The Muslim League rejected the Quit India movement and worked closely with the Raj authorities.

Subhas Chandra Bose (also called Netaji) broke with Congress and tried to form a military alliance with Germany or Japan to gain independence. The Germans assisted Bose in the formation of the Indian Legion; however, it was Japan that helped him revamp the Indian National Army (INA), after the First Indian National Army under Mohan Singh was dissolved. The INA fought under Japanese direction, mostly in Burma. Bose also headed the Provisional Government of Free India (or Azad Hind), a government-in-exile based in Singapore. The government of Azad Hind had its own currency, court, and civil code; and in the eyes of some Indians its existence gave a greater legitimacy to the independence struggle against the British.

By 1942, neighbouring Burma was invaded by Japan, which by then had already captured the Indian territory of Andaman and Nicobar Islands. Japan gave nominal control of the islands to the Provisional Government of Free India on 21 October 1943, and in the following March, the Indian National Army with the help of Japan crossed into India and advanced as far as Kohima in Nagaland. This advance on the mainland of the Indian subcontinent reached its farthest point on Indian territory, retreating from the Battle of Kohima in June and from that of Imphal on 3 July 1944.

The region of Bengal in British India suffered a devastating famine during 1940–1943. An estimated 2.1–3 million died from the famine, frequently characterised as "man-made", with most sources asserting that wartime colonial policies exacerbated the crisis.

Indian independence movement (1885–1947) 

The numbers of British in India were small, yet they were able to rule 52% of the Indian subcontinent directly and exercise considerable leverage over the princely states that accounted for 48% of the area.

One of the most important events of the 19th century was the rise of Indian nationalism, leading Indians to seek first "self-rule" and later "complete independence". However, historians are divided over the causes of its rise. Probable reasons include a "clash of interests of the Indian people with British interests", "racial discriminations", and "the revelation of India's past".

The first step toward Indian self-rule was the appointment of councillors to advise the British viceroy in 1861 and the first Indian was appointed in 1909. Provincial Councils with Indian members were also set up. The councillors' participation was subsequently widened into legislative councils. The British built a large British Indian Army, with the senior officers all British and many of the troops from small minority groups such as Gurkhas from Nepal and Sikhs. The civil service was increasingly filled with natives at the lower levels, with the British holding the more senior positions.

Bal Gangadhar Tilak, an Indian nationalist leader, declared Swaraj (home rule) as the destiny of the nation. His popular sentence "Swaraj is my birthright, and I shall have it" became the source of inspiration for Indians. Tilak was backed by rising public leaders like Bipin Chandra Pal and Lala Lajpat Rai, who held the same point of view, notably they advocated the Swadeshi movement involving the boycott of all imported items and the use of Indian-made goods; the triumvirate were popularly known as Lal Bal Pal. Under them, India's three big provinces – Maharashtra, Bengal and Punjab shaped the demand of the people and India's nationalism. In 1907, the Congress was split into two factions: The radicals, led by Tilak, advocated civil agitation and direct revolution to overthrow the British Empire and the abandonment of all things British. The moderates, led by leaders like Dadabhai Naoroji and Gopal Krishna Gokhale, on the other hand, wanted reform within the framework of British rule.

The partition of Bengal in 1905 further increased the revolutionary movement for Indian independence. The disenfranchisement lead some to take violent action.

The British themselves adopted a "carrot and stick" approach in recognition of India's support during the First World War and in response to renewed nationalist demands. The means of achieving the proposed measure were later enshrined in the Government of India Act 1919, which introduced the principle of a dual mode of administration, or diarchy, in which elected Indian legislators and appointed British officials shared power. In 1919, Colonel Reginald Dyer ordered his troops to fire their weapons on peaceful protestors, including unarmed women and children, resulting in the Jallianwala Bagh massacre; which led to the Non-cooperation Movement of 1920–1922. The massacre was a decisive episode towards the end of British rule in India.

From 1920 leaders such as Mahatma Gandhi began highly popular mass movements to campaign against the British Raj using largely peaceful methods. The Gandhi-led independence movement opposed the British rule using non-violent methods like non-co-operation, civil disobedience and economic resistance. However, revolutionary activities against the British rule took place throughout the Indian subcontinent and some others adopted a militant approach like the Hindustan Republican Association, founded by Chandrasekhar Azad, Bhagat Singh, Sukhdev Thapar and others, that sought to overthrow British rule by armed struggle.

The All India Azad Muslim Conference gathered in Delhi in April 1940 to voice its support for an independent and united India. Its members included several Islamic organisations in India, as well as 1400 nationalist Muslim delegates. The pro-separatist All-India Muslim League worked to try to silence those nationalist Muslims who stood against the partition of India, often using "intimidation and coercion". The murder of the All India Azad Muslim Conference leader Allah Bakhsh Soomro also made it easier for the pro-separatist All-India Muslim League to demand the creation of a Pakistan.

After World War II (c. 1946–1947) 

In January 1946, several mutinies broke out in the armed services, starting with that of RAF servicemen frustrated with their slow repatriation to Britain. The mutinies came to a head with mutiny of the Royal Indian Navy in Bombay in February 1946, followed by others in Calcutta, Madras, and Karachi. The mutinies were rapidly suppressed. Also in early 1946, new elections were called and Congress candidates won in eight of the eleven provinces.

Late in 1946, the Labour government decided to end British rule of India, and in early 1947 it announced its intention of transferring power no later than June 1948 and participating in the formation of an interim government.

Along with the desire for independence, tensions between Hindus and Muslims had also been developing over the years. The Muslims had always been a minority within the Indian subcontinent, and the prospect of an exclusively Hindu government made them wary of independence; they were as inclined to mistrust Hindu rule as they were to resist the foreign Raj.

Muslim League leader Muhammad Ali Jinnah proclaimed 16 August 1946 as Direct Action Day, with the stated goal of highlighting, peacefully, the demand for a Muslim homeland in British India, which resulted in the outbreak of the cycle of violence that would be later called the "Great Calcutta Killing of August 1946". The communal violence spread to Bihar (where Muslims were attacked by Hindus), to Noakhali in Bengal (where Hindus were targeted by Muslims), in Garhmukteshwar in the United Provinces (where Muslims were attacked by Hindus), and on to Rawalpindi in March 1947 in which Sikhs and Hindus were attacked or driven out by Muslims.

Independence and partition (c. 1947–present) 

In August 1947, the British Indian Empire was partitioned into the Union of India and Dominion of Pakistan. In particular, the partition of Punjab and Bengal led to rioting between Hindus, Muslims, and Sikhs in these provinces and spread to other nearby regions, leaving some 500,000 dead. The police and army units were largely ineffective. The British officers were gone, and the units were beginning to tolerate if not actually indulge in violence against their religious enemies. Also, this period saw one of the largest mass migrations anywhere in modern history, with a total of 12 million Hindus, Sikhs and Muslims moving between the newly created nations of India and Pakistan (which gained independence on 15 and 14 August 1947 respectively). In 1971, Bangladesh, formerly East Pakistan and East Bengal, seceded from Pakistan.

Historiography 
In recent decades there have been four main schools of historiography in how historians study India: Cambridge, Nationalist, Marxist, and subaltern. The once common "Orientalist" approach, with its image of a sensuous, inscrutable, and wholly spiritual India, has died out in serious scholarship.

The "Cambridge School", led by Anil Seal, Gordon Johnson, Richard Gordon, and David A. Washbrook, downplays ideology. However, this school of historiography is criticised for western bias or Eurocentrism.

The Nationalist school has focused on Congress, Gandhi, Nehru and high level politics. It highlighted the Mutiny of 1857 as a war of liberation, and Gandhi's 'Quit India' begun in 1942, as defining historical events. This school of historiography has received criticism for elitism.

The Marxists have focused on studies of economic development, landownership, and class conflict in precolonial India and of deindustrialisation during the colonial period. The Marxists portrayed Gandhi's movement as a device of the bourgeois elite to harness popular, potentially revolutionary forces for its own ends. Again, the Marxists are accused of being "too much" ideologically influenced.

The "subaltern school", was begun in the 1980s by Ranajit Guha and Gyan Prakash. It focuses attention away from the elites and politicians to "history from below", looking at the peasants using folklore, poetry, riddles, proverbs, songs, oral history and methods inspired by anthropology. It focuses on the colonial era before 1947 and typically emphasises caste and downplays class, to the annoyance of the Marxist school.

More recently, Hindu nationalists have created a version of history to support their demands for Hindutva ('Hinduness') in Indian society. This school of thought is still in the process of development. In March 2012, Diana L. Eck, professor of Comparative Religion and Indian Studies at Harvard University, authored in her book India: A Sacred Geography, that the idea of India dates to a much earlier time than the British or the Mughals; it was not just a cluster of regional identities and it was not ethnic or racial.

See also 

 Adivasi
 Early Indians
 List of Indian periods
 Economic history of India
 History of India (1947–present)
 Foreign relations of India
 Indian maritime history
 Linguistic history of India
 Military history of India
 Outline of ancient India
 Taxation in medieval India
 The Cambridge History of India
 Timeline of Indian history
 Traditional games of India

References

Notes

Citations

Sources

Printed sources

Further reading

General 
 Basham, A.L., ed. The Illustrated Cultural History of India (Oxford University Press, 2007)
 Buckland, C.E. Dictionary of Indian Biography (1906) 495pp full text
 Chakrabarti D.K. 2009. India, an archaeological history : palaeolithic beginnings to early historic foundations.
 
 Dharma Kumar and Meghnad Desai, eds. The Cambridge Economic History of India: Volume 2, c. 1751–1970 (2nd ed. 2010), 1114pp of scholarly articles
 Fisher, Michael. An Environmental History of India: From Earliest Times to the Twenty-First Century (Cambridge UP, 2018)
 Guha, Ramachandra. India After Gandhi: The History of the World's Largest Democracy (2007), 890pp; since 1947
 James, Lawrence. Raj: The Making and Unmaking of British India (2000) online
 Khan, Yasmin. The Raj At War: A People's History Of India's Second World War (2015); also published as India At War: The Subcontinent and the Second World War India At War: The Subcontinent and the Second World War.
 Khan, Yasmin. The Great Partition: The Making of India and Pakistan (2n d ed. Yale UP 2017) excerpt
 Mcleod, John. The History of India (2002) excerpt and text search
 Majumdar, R.C. : An Advanced History of India. London, 1960. 
 Majumdar, R.C. (ed.) : The History and Culture of the Indian People, Bombay, 1977 (in eleven volumes).
 Mansingh, Surjit The A to Z of India (2010), a concise historical encyclopedia
 Markovits, Claude, ed. A History of Modern India, 1480–1950 (2002) by a team of French scholars
 Metcalf, Barbara D. and Thomas R. Metcalf. A Concise History of Modern India (2006)
 Peers, Douglas M. India under Colonial Rule: 1700–1885 (2006), 192pp
 Richards, John F. The Mughal Empire (The New Cambridge History of India) (1996)
 Riddick, John F. The History of British India: A Chronology (2006) excerpt
 Riddick, John F. Who Was Who in British India (1998); 5000 entries excerpt
 Rothermund, Dietmar. An Economic History of India: From Pre-Colonial Times to 1991 (1993)
 Sharma, R.S., India's Ancient Past, (Oxford University Press, 2005)
 Sarkar, Sumit. Modern India, 1885–1947 (2002)
 
 Singhal, D.P. A History of the Indian People (1983)
 Smith, Vincent. The Oxford History of India (3rd ed. 1958), old-fashioned
 Spear, Percival. A History of India. Volume 2. Penguin Books. (1990) [First published 1965]
 Stein, Burton. A History of India (1998)
 Thapar, Romila. Early India: From the Origins to AD 1300 (2004) excerpt and text search
 Thompson, Edward, and G.T. Garratt. Rise and Fulfilment of British Rule in India (1934) 690 pages; scholarly survey, 1599–1933 excerpt and text search
 Tomlinson, B.R. The Economy of Modern India, 1860–1970 (The New Cambridge History of India) (1996)
 Tomlinson, B.R. The political economy of the Raj, 1914–1947 (1979) online
 Wolpert, Stanley. A New History of India (8th ed. 2008) online 7th edition

Historiography 
 
 
 Bose, Mihir. "India's Missing Historians: Mihir Bose Discusses the Paradox That India, a Land of History, Has a Surprisingly Weak Tradition of Historiography", History Today 57#9 (2007) pp. 34–. online

Primary 
  Highly detailed description of all of India in 1901.

Online resources 
 

 
India